Hunt-class may refer to:
 Hunt-class minesweeper (1916)
 Hunt-class destroyer (built 1939–1943)
 Hunt-class mine countermeasures vessel (built 1978–1988)